is a Japanese Nintendo 64 game of the Bomberman franchise.

Gameplay 
It is based more on the SNES Bomberman titles, and is fully 2D without any 3D graphics. It includes "Panic Bomber" mode from the SNES Bomberman games. It also includes a mini-game called "Same Game" which is a tile matching 2D puzzle game focused on eliminating blocks.

"Bomberman Mode" features standard Bomberman gameplay, but also features multiple exits per room, and thus branching paths. Multiplayer also features "Tandem Mode", where two players work together. Up to four players can play multi-player mode.

Release 
The game was released on December 20, 2001. It was the final game released for the Nintendo 64 in Japan.

It is often confused with the 1997 game Bomberman 64, which was released in Japan as Baku Bomberman.

References

External links 

 Official Website (in Japanese)

2001 video games
64
Japan-exclusive video games
Nintendo 64 games
Nintendo 64-only games
Racjin games
Multiplayer and single-player video games
Video games developed in Japan
Action video games
Hudson Soft games